In organic chemistry, a radical anion is a free radical species that carries a negative charge. Radical anions are encountered in organic chemistry as reduced derivatives of polycyclic aromatic compounds, e.g. sodium naphthenide. An example of a non-carbon radical anion is the superoxide anion, formed by transfer of one electron to an oxygen molecule.

Polycyclic radical anions 
Many aromatic compounds can undergo one-electron reduction by alkali metals. The electron is transferred from the alkali metal ion to an unoccupied antibonding p-p п* orbital of the aromatic molecule.  This transfer is usually only energetically favorable if the aprotic solvent efficiently solvates the alkali metal ion.  Effective solvents are those that bind to the alkali metal cation: diethyl ether < THF < 1,2-dimethoxyethane < HMPA.  In principle any unsaturated molecule can form a radical anion, but the antibonding orbitals are only energetically accessible in more extensive conjugated systems.  Ease of formation is in the order benzene < naphthalene < anthracene < pyrene, etc. Salts of the radical anions are often not isolated as solids but used in situ.  They are usually deeply colored.
Naphthalene in the form of 
Lithium naphthalene is obtained from the reaction of naphthalene with lithium.
Sodium naphthalene is obtained from the reaction of naphthalene with sodium. 
Sodium 1-methylnaphthalene and 1-methylnaphthalene are more soluble than sodium naphthalene and naphthalene, respectively.
biphenyl as its lithium salt.
acenaphthylene is a milder reductant than the naphthalene anion.
anthracene in the form of its alkali metal salts.
pyrene as its sodium salt.
Perylene in the form of its alkali metal (M = Li, Na, Cs) etherates.

Other examples
Cyclooctatetraene is reduced by elemental potassium to the dianion. The resulting dianion is a 10-pi electron system, which conforms to the Huckel rule for aromaticity. Quinone is reduced to a semiquinone radical anion. Semidiones are derived from the reduction of dicarbonyl compounds.

Reactions

Redox
The pi-radical anions are used as reducing agents in specialized syntheses. Being soluble in at least some solvents, these salts act faster than the alkali metals themselves.  The disadvantages are that the polycyclic hydrocarbon must be removed. The reduction potential of alkali metal naphthalene salts is about 3.1 V (vs Fc+/0). The reduction potentials of the larger systems are lower, for example acenaphthalene is 2.45 V. Many radical anions are susceptible to further reduction to dianions.

Protonation
Addition of a proton source (even water) to a radical anion results in protonation, i.e. the sequence of reduction followed by protonation is equivalent to hydrogenation. For instance, the anthracene radical anion forms mainly (but not exclusively) 9,10-dihydroanthracene. Radical anions and their protonation are central to the Birch reduction.

Coordination to metal ions
Radical anions of polycyclic aromatic compounds function as ligands in organometallic chemistry.

Radical cations 
Cationic radical species are much less common than the anions. Denoted , they appear prominently in mass spectrometry. When a gas-phase molecule is subjected to electron ionization one electron is abstracted by an electron in the electron beam to create a radical cation M+.. This species represents the molecular ion or parent ion. A typical mass spectrum shows multiple signals because the molecular ion fragments into a complex mixture of ions and uncharged radical species. For example, the methanol radical cation fragments into a methenium cation CH3+ and a hydroxyl radical. In naphthalene the unfragmented radical cation is by far the most prominent peak in the mass spectrum. Secondary species are generated from proton gain (M+1) and proton loss (M-1).

Some compounds containing the dioxygenyl cation can be prepared in bulk.

Organic conductors
Radical cations figure prominently in the chemistry and properties of conducting polymers. Such polymers are formed by the oxidation of heterocycles to give radical cations, which condense with the parent heterocycle. For example, polypyrrole is prepared by oxidation of pyrrole using ferric chloride in methanol:
n C4H4NH + 2 FeCl3 → (C4H2NH)n + 2 FeCl2 + 2 HCl
Once formed, these polymers become conductive upon oxidation. Polarons and bipolarons are radical cations encountered in doped conducting polymers.

References

Reactive intermediates
Mass spectrometry